Estelle Cascino and Camilla Rosatello were the defending champions but Rosatello chose not to participate. 

Cascino partnered alongside Irina Khromacheva, but lost in the final to Andrea Gámiz and Andrea Lázaro García, 6–4, 2–6, [13–11].

Seeds

Draw

Draw

References

External Links
Main Draw

Open International Féminin de Montpellier - Doubles